Ireland competed at the 2020 Summer Paralympics in Tokyo, Japan, from 24 August to 5 September 2021.

Medalists

Archery 

Women's individual

Athletics 

Men's track

Women's track

Men's field

Women's field

Cycling 

Ireland are sending 4 male and 3 female cyclists to the Paralympics. The 4 men are the pair of Martin Gordon & Eamon Brynes, Ronan Grimes and Gary O' Reilly.  The 3 women are the pair of Katie-George Dunlevy & Eve McCrystal and Richael Timothy.

Men's road

Women's road

Men's track

Women's track

Equestrian 

Ireland are sending 4 para dressage competitors over to the Paralympics. The 4 riders are Tamsin Addison with her horse Fahrenheit 212, Rosemary Gaffney with her horse Werona, Michael Murphy with his horse Cleverboy and Kate Kerr Horan with her horse Serafina T.

Individual

Team

* Indicates the three best individual scores that count towards the team total.

Paracanoeing 

Men

Powerlifting 

Women

Shooting

Ireland entered one athlete into the Paralympic competition. Phil Eaglesham successfully break the Paralympic qualification at the 2019 WSPS World Championships which was held in Sydney, Australia.

Swimming 

Five Irish swimmers have successfully qualified after breaking the MQS (Minimum Qualification Standard).

Men

Women

Table Tennis 

Men

See also
Ireland at the Paralympics
Ireland at the 2020 Summer Olympics

References 

2020
2021 in Irish sport
Nations at the 2020 Summer Paralympics